Michèle Laframboise (born July 14, 1960) is a Canadian science fiction writer and comics artist.

The daughter of Québécois parents, she was born in London and studied geography at the Université de Montréal and civil engineering at the École Polytechnique de Montréal. She is also a self-taught illustrator.

Her first novel Les nuages de Phoenix (2001) was awarded the Prix Cécile-Gagnon. She received Prix Aurora Awards in 2005 for Best novel in French ( Les Mémoires de l'Arc) and Best story in French ("Ceux qui ne comptent pas") and received another Aurora award in 2009 (La Quête de Chaaas); she was a finalist for another Aurora award in 2010. She received the Prix Solaris in 2010 and was a finalist for a Governor General's Literary Award in 2009.

She is currently living near Toronto.

Novels 

 Les voyages du Jules-Verne series: Piège pour le Jules-Verne (2002) Le stratège de Léda (2003) Les mémoires de l'Arc (2004) Le Dragon de l'Alliance (2005) Montréal, Mediaspaul
 La quête de Chaaas series: La quête de Chaaas (2007), Les vents de Tammerlan (2008), L'axe de Koudriss (2010), La spirale de Lar Jubal, (2011), Le labyrinthe de Luurdu (2012) Montréal, Mediaspaul
 Mica, fille de Transyl, Gatineau, Vents d'Ouest (2012)
 Le projet Ithuriel, Ottawa, David, 2012
 La reine Margot, Gatineau, Vents d'Ouest, 2014
 L'écologie d'Odi, Montréal, Porte-Bonheur, Collection Clowns vengeurs, 2015 
 Le Gant, Gatineau, Vents d'Ouest, 2016
 La ruche, Sherbrooke, Les Six Brumes, 2017

Graphic Novels 
 La plume japonaise, Vermillon, Ottawa, 2010, 56 p.

Selected short-stories 
 Screaming Fire (2022) in Asimov’s Vol. 46, 7-8
 Rare Earths Pineapple (2022) in Analog July–August
 October's Feast(2022) in Asimov’s Vol. 46, 1-2
 Shooting at Warner’s Bay (2021) Asimov’s Vol. 45, 9-10
 Cousin Entropy (2020) in Future SF Digest  7
 Ganymede's Lamps (2020) in Luna Station Quarterly 42
 Ice Monarch (2018) in Abyss&Apex no67
 Domus Justice (2018) in Fiction River no27
 Thinking Inside the Box (2017) in Compelling Science Fiction no7
 Slime and Crime (2017) in Fiction River no22
 Closing the Big Bang (2017) in Fiction River no21
 La cousine Entropie (2016) in Galaxies 40
 Sous réserve (2016) dans Brins d'éternité 43
 Penser à l'intérieur de la boîte (2015) dans Géante Rouge 23
 Monarque des glaces (2010) Solaris 175 - Solaris Prize Winner 2010 (reprinted in 2012 in Galaxies 18)
 Le Vol de l'abeille (2006), Solaris  159 – Solaris Prize Winner 2006 Women are from Mars, Men are from Venus (2006), Tesseract 10, Edge publ.''

References 

1960 births
Living people
Canadian science fiction writers
Canadian comics artists
Canadian women novelists
Canadian novelists in French
Université de Montréal alumni
Women science fiction and fantasy writers
Canadian female comics artists
Canadian short story writers in French
Canadian women short story writers
21st-century Canadian novelists
21st-century Canadian short story writers
21st-century Canadian women writers